Ece Seçkin (born 12 September 1991) is a Turkish pop singer. She is well known in Turkey for her songs such as "Aman Aman",  "Olsun", "Adeyyo", and "Hoş Geldin Ayrılığa". Several of her songs have over a hundred million views. As of 1 November 2016, "Adeyyo" is the third most popular song in Turkey.

Discography

EPs
 2012: Bu Ne Yaa
 2015: Aman Aman
 2016: Zamanım Yok

Singles
As lead artist
 2014: "Şok Oldum"
 2016: "Hoş Geldin Ayrılığa" (with Kolpa)
 2016: "Wet" (with Ozan Doğulu and Baby Brown)
 2018: "Dibine Dibine"
 2019: "Nos Fuimos Lejos" (with Descemer Bueno and Enrique Iglesias featuring El Micha)
 2019: "Geçmiş Zaman"
 2019: "Benjamins 3" (with Rozz Kalliope)
 2020: "Acayip İyi"
 2021: "Yastık"
 2021: "Bon Voyage" (with Faruk Sabancı)
 2021: "Zafer İçin Doğanlar"
 2022: "Sen Hala Ordasın"
 2022: "Güzelim"
 2022: "Karma" (with Anıl Piyancı and Genco Ecer)

As featured artist
 2014: "Hoşuna mı Gidiyor" (with Ozan Doğulu) (from the album 130 Bpm Moderato)
 2017: "O La La" (with Sinan Ceceli) (from the album Söyle)
 2017: "Sayın Seyirciler" (with Ozan Doğulu) (from the album 130 Bpm Forte)
 2018: "Vazgeçtim" (from the album Yıldız Tilbe'nin Yıldızlı Şarkıları)
 2020: "Anlayamazsın" (with Sinan Akçıl) (from the album Piyanist)
 2022: "Ağladın Ya" (with Sinan Akçıl) (from the album Piyanist 2)
 2022: "Yeşil Su" (from the album Serdar Ortaç Şarkıları, Vol. 1)

Music videos
 2012: "Bu Ne Yaa"
 2012: "Mahşer"
 2014: "Şok Oldum" 
 2014: "Hoşuna mı Gidiyor" 
 2015: "Aman Aman"
 2015: "Follow Me"
 2016: "Hoş Geldin Ayrılığa"
 2016: "Adeyyo"
 2017: "Olsun"
 2017: "O La La"
 2017: "Sayın Seyirciler"
 2018: "Dibine Dibine"
 2019: "Vazgeçtim"
 2019: "Nos Fuimos Lejos" (Turkish Version)
 2019: "Geçmiş Zaman"
 2019: "Benjamins 3"
 2020: "Anlayamazsın"
 2020: "Acayip İyi"
 2021: "Yastık"
 2021: "Zafer İçin Doğanlar"
 2022: "Sen Hala Ordasın"
 2022: "Güzelim"
 2022: "Karma"

References

External links
 
 
 
 

Living people
1991 births
Singers from Istanbul
Turkish pop singers